Eutaenia trifasciella is a species of beetle in the family Cerambycidae. It was described by White in 1850, originally under the genus Lamia. It is known from Laos, China, Vietnam and Malaysia.

References

Lamiini
Beetles described in 1850